List of the published works by or about Jon Lee Anderson, American journalist.

Books

Essays and reporting 
 
 
 
 
 
 
 
 
 
 
 
 
 
 
 
 
 
 
 
 
 
 
  Leonardo Padura Fuentes.
 
 
  Michel Martelly

Interviews

Notes

Bibliographies by writer
Bibliographies of American writers